The American Sikh Congressional Caucus is a congressional caucus focusing on the interests of the American Sikh community. Co-launched by Judy Chu (D-California) and David Valadao (R-California), the caucus seeks to address issues such as military discrimination, violence and bullying of Sikhs and raise general awareness of Sikhs and their contributions to America. On February 9, 2021, it was announced that U.S. Representatives John Garamendi (D-CA) and David Valadao (R-CA) would serve as the Co-Chairs of the American Sikh Congressional Caucus.

House members

As of August 10, 2022, the Caucus consists of 33 members

Democrats

 John Garamendi (Co-chair)
 Judy Chu (Vice-chair)
 Karen Bass Retiring at end of 117th Congress.
 Ami Bera
 Tony Cardenas
 Gerry Connolly
 Jim Costa
 Mark DeSaulnier
 Anna Eshoo
 Al Green
 Raúl Grijalva
 Hank Johnson
 Barbara Lee
 Ted Lieu
 Zoe Lofgren
 Carolyn Maloney
 Doris Matsui
 Jerry McNerney Retiring at end of 117th Congress.
 Grace Meng
 Frank Pallone
 Bill Pascrell
 Raul Ruiz
 Jan Schakowsky
 Brad Sherman
 Adam Smith
 Jackie Speier Retiring at end of 117th Congress.
 Eric Swalwell
 Mark Takano
 Mike Thompson

Republicans

 David Valadao (Co-Chair)
 Doug LaMalfa
 Tom McClintock

References

Sikhism in the United States
Caucuses of the United States Congress